I fuorilegge del matrimonio, internationally released as Outlaws of Love, is a 1963 Italian anthology comedy film. It is the second and last film directed both by Paolo and Vittorio Taviani and Valentino Orsini.

It is inspired by the draft law presented by the Socialist Senator Renato Luigi Sansone to the approval of the so-called "small divorce".

Plot

Cast 
Ugo Tognazzi: Vasco Timballo
Annie Girardot: Margherita
Romolo Valli: Francesco
Scilla Gabel: Wilma
Marina Malfatti: Rosanna 
Enzo Robutti
Gabriella Giorgelli

References

External links

1963 films
Films directed by Valentino Orsini
Films directed by Paolo and Vittorio Taviani
Italian comedy films
1963 comedy films
Films scored by Giovanni Fusco
1960s Italian-language films
1960s Italian films